Brankovice is a market town in Vyškov District in the South Moravian Region of the Czech Republic. It has about 900 inhabitants.

References

Populated places in Vyškov District
Market towns in the Czech Republic